The Platform is the debut studio album of the West Coast hip hop group Dilated Peoples. It was released in 2000 under the Capitol Records label, and represents a movement of several California underground hip hop artists away from the violence and misogyny of gangsta rap, towards a more traditional, conscious form of rap.

Track listing

Samples
So May I Introduce to You (Interlude)
"Put Your Hand in the Hand" by Ocean
"Sgt. Pepper's Lonely Hearts Club Band" by Bill Cosby
The Platform
"I'm in Love Again" by Millie Jackson
"Work It Out" by Supernatural
"Come Clean" by Jeru the Damaja
No Retreat
"Flower Pot" by Loadstone
"Mad Crew" by KRS-One
"Next Level (Nyte Time Mix)" by Showbiz & A.G.
Guaranteed
"I Can't Please You" by The Loading Zone
Right On
"Impeach the President" by The Honey Drippers
"Strange Games & Things" by Love Unlimited Orchestra
"Memoirs of the Traveler" by The Jaggerz
The Main Event
"Strictly Snappin' Necks" by EPMD
"My Melody" by Eric B. & Rakim
"Change the Beat (Female Version)" by Beside 
"The MC" by KRS-One
Service
"At the Fair" by The Counts
"Just Rhymin' With Biz" by Big Daddy Kane 
Ear Drums Pop
"La Ballata Di Hank McCain" by Ennio Morricone
"Ghetto Like D&D" by D&D All-Stars 
"Out of Nowhere" by Ferrante & Teicher
Annihilation
"Snidely Whiplash" by Alexander Review
"Clones" by The Roots 
"Movin'" by Brass Construction 
Expanding Man
"D. Original" by Jeru the Damaja
"Busy Aggregation" by Johnny Pearson
"On Deadly Ground" by Iriscience
" Friction" by DJ Vadim
The Last Line of Defense
"Is Anyone There?" by Hookfoot
"Tru Master" by Pete Rock 
Triple Optics
"Light My Life" by Tami Lynn
The Shape of Things to Come
"Take a Chance on Love" by Ted Heath and His Music
"Freelance" by Grandmaster Flash
"Triple Threat" by Z-3 MC's
Work the Angles
"I Got Some" by Sugar Billy Garner
"The Killing Fight" by Joseph Koo 
"Audible Angels" by Visionaries
"God Lives Through" by A Tribe Called Quest
Ear Drums Pop (Remix)
"D.A.I.S.Y. Age" by De La Soul

Charts

References

2000 debut albums
Dilated Peoples albums
Albums produced by Evidence (musician)
Albums produced by the Alchemist (musician)
Capitol Records albums